The Scottish Open in badminton is an open international championships held in Scotland since 1907 and is thereby one of the oldest badminton tournaments in the world. The tournament was halted during the two World Wars.

Past winners

Performances by nation
Updated after 2021 edition.

References 

 
Recurring sporting events established in 1907
1907 establishments in Scotland
Badminton tournaments in Scotland